Henicops dentatus is a species of centipede in the Henicopidae family. It is endemic to Australia. It was first described in 1901 by British zoologist Reginald Innes Pocock.

Distribution
The species occurs in south-west Western Australia. The type locality is Perth.

Behaviour
The centipedes are solitary terrestrial predators that inhabit plant litter and soil.

References

 

 
dentatus
Centipedes of Australia
Endemic fauna of Australia
Fauna of Western Australia
Animals described in 1901
Taxa named by R. I. Pocock